Vallarasu is a 2000 Indian Tamil-language action film directed by N. Maharajan in his film debut. The film stars Vijayakanth and Devayani. The music is by Deva.  It was released on 14 April to positive reviews and became a Blockbuster. The movie was remade in Hindi as Indian (2001), also directed by same director and which Mukesh Rishi reprising his role.

Plot 
Vallarasu (Vijayakanth) is the honest Deputy Commissioner of Police who has arrested Wasim Khan (Mukesh Rishi), a terrorist from Pakistan. His wife is Anjali (Devayani), and they both have two children. Vallarasu kills his senior police officer and father-in-law (Raghuvaran) because he knows that the latter is working with terrorists. Anjali leaves Vallarasu after she learns that he killed her father. Vallarasu takes the help of youths (including Darshan and Sriman) who are disillusioned by their inability to join the police force to fight violence. Vallarasu fights R. Kandasamy (P. Vasu), a rich man who is behind the attempts to destabilize the country. With the help of Seshadri (Karan), a software engineer, Vallarasu succeeds in killing Kandasamy's son. In retaliation, Kandaswamy attacks Raheem (Sriman) and Seshadri, who both die. In the climax, Anjali unites with Vallarasu after knowing the truth. Vallarasu also kills both Kandasamy and Wasim Khan.

Cast 

 Vijayakanth as DCP Vallarasu
 Devayani as Anjali
 Raghuvaran as DGP Jagannathan, Anjali's father
 Livingston as CBI officer Chidambaram Pillai
 Karan as Seshadri
 Mansoor Ali Khan as Esakki Muthu Pandian
 Mukesh Rishi as Wasim Khan
 P. Vasu as R. Kandasamy
 R. Sundarrajan as Raheem's brother
 Vijay Krishnaraj as Vijayaraghavan
 Thalaivasal Vijay as Edward
 Ponnambalam as Manikkam
 Kazan Khan as Terrorist
 Peeli Sivam as Police commissioner
 Raviraj as Swamy Kannan
 Laxmi Rattan as Director general of police
 Thyagu as Seshadri's brother-in-law
 Ambika as Anjali's mother
 Dubbing Janaki as Seshadri's mother
 Charulatha as Seshadri's fiancée
 Master Naveen as Naveen, Vallarasu's son
 Baby Nisha as Nisha, Vallarasu's daughter
 Richard Rajasekhar as Rajasekhar, R. Kandasamy's son
 Sriman as Raheem, Vallarasu's henchman
 Darshan as Pandian, Vallarasu's henchman
 Kovai Easwar as Easwar
 Chitti as Chitti
 Crane Manohar as Jewellery shop owner
 Auditor Sridhar as Seshadri's father
 S. Rajasekar as Lawyer
 Ravi Raj as Judge
 Bobby as Nelson
 Sakthivel as Rowdy
 Nirmala Periyasamy as Newsreader
 Vellai Subbaiah as Man at the wedding hall
 Robo Chandru
 Sampath Ram as Police officer (uncredited role)
 Nitish Veera as Police officer (uncredited role)
 Vadivelu in a special appearance
 Bhanusri in a special appearance

Production 
One scene was of Vijayakanth and Devayani at a jewellery shop in T. Nagar in Chennai. The song "Aruppukottai Akka ponnu " was filmed near Pollachi and 100 dancers joined the lead pair. Choreography was by dance master Haridas. A lavish set was erected at A.V.M. Studios where a stunt scene was filmed between Vijayakanth and Richard. Some stunt scenes were filmed between Vijayakanth and Richard. Some stunt artists who portrayed Richard's henchmen also participated in the shot. Apart from Chennai, shooting locations were at New Delhi and Kulu Manali. Bollywood villain Mukesh Rishi made his debut in Tamil cinema with this film. Director P. Vasu made his debut as an actor with this film in a negative role and Darshan would later as one of biggest stars in Kannada cinema, made his debut in small role.

Soundtrack 
The soundtrack album and background score were composed by Deva. The lyrics were penned by Vairamuthu and Kalidasan.

Release 
A critic from TMCafe.com gave the film a positive review, stating the "script is spiced with the right dose of emotion, sentiment and action, mixed with a heavy dose of patriotism" and that "Maharajan handles the megaphone like a seasoned veteran". The Hindu wrote, "The overpowering grit and idealism that Vallarasu exudes, rubs off on the audience too and is an energising factor, at least to a certain extent".

References

External links 
 

2000 action films
2000 films
2000s Tamil-language films
Fictional portrayals of the Tamil Nadu Police
Films about terrorism in India
Films scored by Deva (composer)
Films shot in Delhi
Films shot in Himachal Pradesh
Indian action films
Tamil films remade in other languages